Fox were a British-based pop band popular in the mid-1970s. Led by American songwriter and record producer Kenny Young, the band was perhaps best known for its charismatic Australian lead singer Noosha Fox. They achieved three top 20 hits on the UK Singles Chart - "Only You Can" and "Imagine Me, Imagine You" in 1975 and "S-S-S-Single Bed" in 1976, and Noosha Fox achieved a solo hit in 1977 with "Georgina Bailey".

Band history
The band was founded by Young, who had composed the song "Under the Boardwalk" for the Drifters in 1964. Young had worked off and on with the Australian singer Susan Traynor on one of his solo albums, Last Stage For Silverworld, where she was listed as 'Amanda' after Young had written Reparata and the Delrons' "Captain of Your Ship", which had been a UK hit.

Young then discovered Northern Irish singer Clodagh Rodgers on a television show, who had recently released the single, "Play The Drama till The End". The partnership produced hit singles over a three-year period, beginning with "Come Back and Shake Me". With this, Rodgers became something of a blueprint for the group, as she recorded demos of some of the songs which would eventually surface on the first Fox album in 1975, as well as earlier Young tunes. Rodgers' husband John Morris was the first manager of the group.

Meanwhile, Traynor was in a folk group called Wooden Horse, which released two albums before breaking up. After his success with Rogers, Young founded Fox with Irish singer Herbie Armstrong, recruiting Traynor as lead singer. She adopted the stage name 'Noosha', a scrambled version of her own name, and a glamorous image inspired by Marlene Dietrich, wearing elegant dresses to contrast with the scruffy look of the rest of the group.

The band's self-titled debut album was released on GTO Records in 1975 to critical acclaim. The lead single, "Only You Can", was originally released in mid-1974 under the title "Only You" and failed to chart, but was reissued at the beginning of 1975 with a word added to its title and was a Top 10 hit in the UK Singles Chart. The follow-up "Imagine Me, Imagine You" later the same year also reached the Top 20 and "He's Got Magic" was a hit in some European countries such as Germany, where it reached #48. The track "Love Ship" was played extensively on Radio Caroline, and was subsequently adopted as one of their theme tunes in the 1970s. Shortly after the release of their first album, Fox made a cameo appearance in the film Side by Side.

However, Noosha shared vocals with other members of the band in 1975 follow-up album, Tails of Illusion, with the songs sung by Noosha, Young, Frank, and Armstrong. The album enjoyed some cult critical acclaim but not the sales success of its predecessor; without Noosha's distinctive voice, casual listeners did not associate the songs with the band that had recorded "Only You Can". Roger Taylor of Queen added backing vocals to the song "Survival".

The band returned to the charts in April 1976 when "S-S-S-Single Bed" was a Top 5 UK hit, and topped the Australian chart. (Bananarama did their own version of this song in 2009 on their album Viva.) Again, the band did not attempt to capitalise upon its previous success, and the accompanying album Blue Hotel (1977), yielded only one further single, even though Noosha was the lead singer on all its tracks.

Noosha Fox left the band after Blue Hotel. Armstrong and Young continued to work together in the band Yellow Dog. Their second single for Virgin became the first hit single that Virgin Records released, "Just One More Night" making it to No. 8 on the UK Singles Chart. After a short period of success, Armstrong went on to work with Van Morrison, and Solley later joined Procol Harum. Noosha launched a solo career, and her first single, "Georgina Bailey", written and produced by Young, briefly entered the Top 40 in the UK Singles Chart (reaching number 31) in 1977.

In 1979, Noosha Fox tried to restart her solo career with a single, "The Heat Is On" (a song written by Florrie Palmer and Tony Ashton), on Chrysalis Records. A later version of the song, by ABBA's Agnetha Fältskog, was a European hit four years later. Noosha recorded several singles in the early 1980s for the Earlobe label but none were successful, and she evidently retired from the music industry, although she did not return to Australia.
 
Fox reformed briefly in 1980, releasing the new wave-influenced "Electro People", written as the theme music for the Kenny Everett Show in 1981. The band considered a reunion in the early 1990s, but the tracks recorded at this time were unreleased until 2004, when they appeared as bonus tracks on the Tails of Illusion CD.

After the band
It was reported in 2007 on BBC Radio 4's The Music Group and again in April 2011 that Noosha Fox was working on new material, but as of 2020 no material has been released commercially.

Herbie Armstrong recently tried to find solo success, appearing on the 2011 series of Britain's Got Talent. He made it through to the live semi-finals but did not make it through to the final. In his semi-final, he appeared singing a version of Barry Manilow's hit, "Mandy".

Members
 Noosha Fox – vocals
 Kenny Young – guitar, vocals
 Herbie Armstrong – guitar, vocals
 Jim Gannon – lead guitar, vocals
 Pete Solley – keyboards, vocals
 Mike Lavender – accordion, electric piano
 Gary Taylor – bass, vocals
 Jim Frank – drums, percussion, vocals

Discography

Albums

Singles

References

English pop music groups
Musical groups established in 1974